Kim Tae-bong (born 28 February 1988) is a South Korean footballer who plays as defender for Daejeon Citizen in K League 2.

Career
He was selected by FC Anyang in 2013 K League draft.

References

External links 

1988 births
Living people
Association football defenders
South Korean footballers
Gangneung City FC players
FC Anyang players
Daejeon Hana Citizen FC players
Korea National League players
K League 1 players
K League 2 players